Paratachardina decorella, the rosette lac scale, is a scale insect in the Kerriidae family.

References

Kerriidae